China Railway Qingzang Group, officially abbreviated as CR Qingzang or CR-Qingzang, also known as CR Qinghai-Tibet and CRQT, formerly, Qinghai-Tibet Railway Company or Qingzang Railway Company is a subsidiaries company under the jurisdiction of the China Railway (formerly the Ministry of Railway). It supervises the railway network within Qinghai and Tibet. The company was founded in 2002 and reincorporated in 2017.

Hub stations
 Xining
 
 Lhasa
 
 Golmud
 
 Xigazê
 
 Delingha
 
 Nagqu

References

Rail transport in Qinghai
Rail transport in Tibet
China Railway Corporation